Stafford Township is one of fifteen townships in Greene County, Indiana, USA.  As of the 2010 census, its population was 448.

Geography

Unincorporated towns
 Marco
(This list is based on USGS data and may include former settlements.)

Adjacent townships
 Stockton Township (north)
 Grant Township (northeast)
 Washington Township (east)
 Vigo Township, Knox County (south)
 Jefferson Township, Sullivan County (west)

Major highways

References
 U.S. Board on Geographic Names (GNIS)
 United States Census Bureau cartographic boundary files

External links
 Indiana Township Association
 United Township Association of Indiana

Townships in Greene County, Indiana
Bloomington metropolitan area, Indiana
Townships in Indiana